José Guillermo Fuentes Ortiz (born 4 December 1951) is a Mexican politician affiliated with the National Action Party. He served as Deputy of the LX Legislature of the Mexican Congress representing Puebla, and previously served as the municipal president of Guadalupe Victoria, Puebla from 2002 to 2005.

References

1951 births
Living people
People from Puebla
National Action Party (Mexico) politicians
21st-century Mexican politicians
Deputies of the LX Legislature of Mexico
Members of the Chamber of Deputies (Mexico) for Puebla
Instituto Politécnico Nacional alumni
Municipal presidents in Puebla